The Arch Deluxe was a hamburger sold by the international fast food restaurant chain McDonald's in 1996 and marketed specifically to adults. It was soon discontinued after failing to become popular despite a massive marketing campaign and now is considered one of the most expensive flops of all time.

Product description 

The Arch Deluxe was a quarter pound of beef on a split-top potato flour sesame seed bun, topped with a circular piece of peppered bacon, leaf lettuce, tomato, American cheese, onions, ketchup, and Dijonnaise (a portmanteau of Dijon mustard and mayonnaise) sauce.

History 
In response to the demographic trend of longer lifespans and an expanding older market, and to its child-centered image, McDonald's made a conscious decision to attempt to market its food to a more adult audience. Rather than change its existing menu items or marketing strategy, the company decided to create a new line of sandwiches with what would hopefully be perceived as more sophisticated ingredients. It commissioned Executive Chef Andrew Selvaggio to create the Deluxe line of burgers including the Fish Filet Deluxe, Grilled Chicken Deluxe, Crispy Chicken Deluxe, and the flagship Arch Deluxe.

The Arch Deluxe was first tested as a "Taste of the Month" burger in October 1995 at McDonald's restaurants in Canada. Afterwards, the Arch Deluxe was officially released in May 1996 in one of the most expensive advertising campaigns to date. Customers were dissuaded, however, by the high price, which ranged from US$2.09 up to US$2.49 (equivalent to $ in ), and unconventional ads, and consumer groups were upset by the higher caloric content. The brand was still sold at select restaurants during 1998 and 1999. On August 18, 2000, the Arch Deluxe was finally discontinued, and is no longer found at McDonald's stores today.

McDonald's is estimated to have spent over US$300 million on the research, production, and marketing for the Arch Deluxe. The company stated in 2003 that some of its initial research into adult marketing was recycled in the development of its successful line of salads.

See also

 McDonald's Deluxe line
 McDonald's products
 List of defunct consumer brands

Criticized fast food products:
 McAfrika

Similar products from other fast food vendors:
 Burger King products
 BK Crown Jewels line
 TenderCrisp sandwich

References

Bibliography

External links 
McDonald's original Arch Deluxe Website from the Internet Wayback Machine

McDonald's foods
Defunct consumer brands
Products introduced in 1996
Fast food hamburgers